Ronde Island, Grenada is a  private island in the Lesser Antilles chain of the Caribbean Sea.

The island was listed for sale as of October 2007 for US$100,000,000, making it at the time the most expensive listed island property in the world.

Historically, the island was inhabited, from which a small community still remains -- making it the third inhabited island in the Grenada Grenadines (after Carriacou and Petite Martinique). 

Ronde Island also contains two small pond and is surrounded by many other islands including Diamond Island (Grenadines), Caille Island, and Les Tantes. The island also provides a habitat for species such as the red-footed tortoise (Chelonoidis carbonarius) and the Grenada tree boa (Corallus grenadensis).

References

See also 
 List of islands in the Caribbean

Islands of Grenada
Private islands of the Caribbean